Eugene Leo McAuliffe  (February 28, 1872 – April 29, 1953) was a Major League Baseball catcher who played for the Boston Beaneaters in 1904. The 32-year-old rookie stood 6'1" and weighed 180 lb.

On August 17, 1904, McAuliffe got into a home game against the Chicago Cubs at South End Grounds.  He was 1-for-2 (.500) at the plate, and behind the plate he had one putout, one assist, and one error for a fielding percentage of .667.

He died in his hometown of Randolph, Massachusetts, aged 81.

External links
Baseball Reference
Retrosheet

1872 births
1953 deaths
Major League Baseball catchers
Boston Beaneaters players
Baseball players from Massachusetts
People from Randolph, Massachusetts
Place of birth missing
Taunton Herrings players
New Bedford Whalers (baseball) players